Anand Vihar Terminal (station code: ANVT) is a railway station in the Anand Vihar locality of Delhi, India. It is under the administrative control of the Delhi Division of the Northern Railway zone of the Indian Railways.

This station was officially inaugurated on 19 December 2009 by the then Union Railway minister Mamata Banerjee, and  Chief Minister of Delhi Sheila Dixit.

History

Anand Vihar Terminal railway station is developed as a terminal station of New Delhi.

Delhi Sarai Rohilla Terminal and Hazrat Nizamuddin Terminal are two more railway terminals in the city of Delhi from where many regional and long-distance trains originate.

Background

The city of Delhi heavily depends on the rail transport to cater for the increasing load of passengers to their destinations. The long-distance trains from Delhi used to ply from three stations namely  (Old Delhi),  and s. These stations lacked the infrastructure facilities to handle such high passenger rush. Also, Delhi is the connecting station for the cities in the Northern states Punjab, Haryana, Himachal Pradesh, Uttar Pradesh, Uttarakhand and Jammu and Kashmir. With increasing passenger pressure at the existing stations, the requirement of additional major passenger terminals was identified by the Northern Railways. The eastbound trains from Delhi to the states of Uttar Pradesh, Bihar, Orissa, Jharkhand West Bengal and other North-eastern states had to cross the bridge over River Yamuna as all the three stations are located on the other side of the river. Thus, the area of Anand Vihar was selected in the trans-Yamuna region to construct a mega-railway terminal. In 2003, Union railway minister Nitish Kumar announced that Delhi would get a new rail terminal at Anand Vihar. The station was commissioned in the 2003 rail budget and in December 2003, Northern Railway floated a tender to employ consultants for Phase-I of Anand Vihar railway station project. The foundation stone of the station was laid by the then Union Minister of Railways, Nitish Kumar on 25 January 2004. The first phase was expected to be completed by 2006.

Development
Due to the delay caused by various reasons, the construction was started by the Northern Railways in October 2006. The deadline for completion of the first phase was initially mid-2007 which was later revised to March 2008 due to various reasons. The station was finally declared clear for public use by the Commissioner of Railway Safety on 20 October 2009 and was officially inaugurated on 19 December 2009 by the Former Union Railway minister, Mamata Banerjee and then Chief Minister of Delhi, Sheila Dikshit. However, regular trains starting to ply from 10 March 2010 and the station continued functioning below capacity till a stampede at New Delhi station on 16 May 2010 made it clear that the New Delhi station handling 300,000 to around 500,000 passengers each day was saturated and thus the Northern Railways decided to transfer more trains to Anand Vihar and utilise it effectively. Northern Railways planned to shift around six more regular trains to Anand Vihar by mid-July and also open the tender inviting global consultancies to propose a masterplan for the station Phase-II which also included augmenting the number of platforms to 7 from the existing 3 platforms in the Phase-I of the project.

Railway station

The terminal is modeled on the lines of the  station at Navi Mumbai. The new terminal also helped to relieve congestion on roads into New Delhi, reducing the load of a million people daily entering the city. The railway terminal is integrated with the Anand Vihar Interstate Bus Terminal (Vivekanand Bus Terminal) and the Anand Vihar station of the Delhi Metro located close by, thus transforming it into a major transportation hub of Delhi. Further, widening of the rail overbridge at Anand Vihar is planned as the current structure is not capable for handling the traffic.

Phase I

Phase I of the two-storey railway station was inaugurated on 19 December 2009 with three platforms, a coach maintenance yard and feeder lines to the Sahibabad Junction. This phase cost  and took five years to be completed. In the inauguration, two new trains – the Anand Vihar-Lucknow Special Train and the Ghaziabad-New Delhi Ladies Special Train were flagged off. A Delhi–Panipat EMU with number of coaches augmented from 12 to 15 was also inaugurated. The two passenger trains to West Bengal-New Jalpaiguri Express and Farakka Express will be shifted to run from this terminal. Further, three existing trains running from Nizamuddin and  stations to Varanasi, Jogbani and Motihari will be shifted to the new terminal to originate from there from March onwards. While the original deadline for completion of the first phase was mid-2007, it was revised to March 2008 and the project was delayed further due to various reasons.

However regular trains from the station started on 10 March 2010. Gradually many trains were shifted from New Delhi and other stations to Anand Vihar. A number of EMUs of the Delhi Suburban Railway pass through the station. Along with that several special trains are run from the station to accommodate the heavy rush of passengers.

Phase II
In phase II the number of platforms will be increased to seven in total and the terminal will have a capacity to handle over three lakh passengers and as many as 270 trains daily. The total cost of the terminal is estimated to be around  including the cost of phase I and it would have a new Passenger Reservation System (PRS). Phase II of the Anand Vihar makeover involves linking this terminal with the original Anand Vihar station (Station code: ANVR) which is a roadside station comprising two platforms serviced by only sub-urban trains. Northern Railways invited a consultant for Phase-II of Anand Vihar for upgrading the station with world-class facilities.

Facilities
The station has facilities like booking offices, booking counters, waiting for halls with facilities for handicapped passengers, high-speed wifi, separate arrival and departure areas, reservation halls, toilets, parcel and luggage office, operational and service accommodation and parking areas. There is one cloakroom as well at the first floor. The station also has some modern amenities like ATMs, a touch-screen enquiry system, foreign exchange counters, commercial and maintenance offices, food plazas, and a computerised ticketing facility. Retiring rooms and dormitories are also provided in the station building. The terminal has a separate parcel loading facility, two escalators and six lifts and a special heritage gallery and custom-made subways which can be used by physically challenged passengers. It will also be the only station in the India where loading and unloading of parcels, linen and food items will be carried out at the station yard and not in the platform as per the prevailing practise, to keep the platforms clean. To enhance the use of solar power under National Solar Mission to generate electricity on its own; Vivaan Solar, a company from Gwalior was chosen to install 1.1 MW of rooftop solar project at the railway station in 2016. The rooftop solar power project under Public Private Partnership will be executed under design, build, finance, operate and transfer (DBFOT) format. The company will also be responsible for maintaining the plant for the next 25 years. There is also a foot-over bridge for pedestrians which connects the railway station to the Delhi metro station at Anand Vihar. In 2020 the station was given a five star rating, the first in Delhi and third in India, for its food related facilities.

Redevelopment
Anand Vihar railway station set for a new makeover! Under Piyush Goyal-led Indian Railways’ ambitious station redevelopment plan, the Indian Railway Stations Development Corporation (IRSDC) will soon be working on giving the Anand Vihar railway station a new look that will be similar to any airport. Revamping railway stations to not just look but also offer airport-like seamless travel experience is a big step taken by IRSDC. The corporation is taking up the Rs 224.48 crore project for the redevelopment of the Anand Vihar railway station which is expected to be completed in 2 years and 9 months after the project is awarded. Railway officials told Financial Express Online that the Anand Vihar Station is being awarded on the EPC or Engineering, Procurement and Construction mode.

Major Trains
Major originating trains from Anand Vihar Railway Station are as follows:

Anand Vihar Terminal - Agartala Tejas Rajdhani Express
 Anand Vihar Terminal - Naharlagun  AC Superfast Express
 Anand Vihar Terminal - Baba Baidyanath Dham Humsafar Express
 Anand Vihar Terminal - Madhupur Humsafar Express
 Anand Vihar Terminal - Gorakhpur Humsafar Express
 Anand Vihar Terminal - Prayagraj Humsafar Express
 Anand Vihar Terminal - Ranchi Jharkhand Sampark Kranti Express
 Anand Vihar Terminal - Bhubaneswar Odisha Sampark Kranti Express
 Anand Vihar Terminal - Sealdah West Bengal Sampark Kranti Express
 Anand Vihar Terminal - Lucknow AC Double Decker Express
 Anand Vihar Terminal - Jaynagar Garib Rath Express
 Anand Vihar Terminal - Varanasi Garib Rath Express
 Anand Vihar Terminal - Bhagalpur Garib Rath Express
 Anand Vihar Terminal - Gaya Garib Rath Express
 Anand Vihar Terminal - Muzzafarpur Garib Rath Express
 Anand Vihar Terminal - Guwahati Northeast Express
 Anand Vihar Terminal - Kamakhya Express
 Anand Vihar Terminal - Maldah Town Express
 Anand Vihar Terminal - Puri Neelachal Superfast Express
 Anand Vihar Terminal - Bhubaneswar Superfast Express
 Anand Vihar Terminal - Raxaul Satyagrah Express
 Anand Vihar Terminal - Raxaul Sathvavana Express
 Anand Vihar Terminal - Puri Nandan Kanan Superfast Express
 Anand Vihar Terminal - Mau Express
 Anand Vihar Terminal - Danapur Jan Sadharan Express
 Anand Vihar Terminal - Lalkuan Intercity Express
 Anand Vihar Terminal - Saharsa Poorbiya Express
 Anand Vihar Terminal - Gorakhpur Express
 Anand Vihar Terminal - Kanpur Central Express
 Anand Vihar Terminal - Motihari Champaran Satyagrah Express
 Anand Vihar Terminal - Jogbani Seemanchal Superfast Express
 Anand Vihar Terminal - Bhagalpur Vikramshila Superfast Express
 Anand Vihar Terminal - Santragachi Superfast Express
 Anand Vihar Terminal - Muzzafarpur Sapt Kranti Express
 Anand Vihar Terminal - Haldia Superfast Express
 Anand Vihar Terminal - Rewa Superfast Express

See also
 List of railway stations in India
 Sarai Rohilla

References

Railway stations in East Delhi district
Railway terminus in India
Railway stations opened in 2009
Delhi railway division
2009 establishments in Delhi